Rhamphognathus is an extinct genus of prehistoric bony fish that lived from the early to middle Eocene.

Description
These fishes have the jaws produced and the snout ends in an acute point.

Species
 Rhamphognathus paralepoides  Agassiz 1835

See also

 Prehistoric fish
 List of prehistoric bony fish

References

Eocene fish